Jolina Amani (born 26 August 1999) is a Dutch footballer who plays as a forward for ADO Den Haag in the Eredivisie.

Personal life
Amani was born in Rotterdam.

References

External links

1999 births
Living people
Dutch women's footballers
Women's association football forwards
Eredivisie (women) players
Dutch sportspeople of Cape Verdean descent
Dutch people of Democratic Republic of the Congo descent
ADO Den Haag (women) players